The FIL European Luge Championships 1996 took place in Sigulda, Latvia.

Men's singles

Demtschenko is the first Russian to medal at the championships since the breakup of the Soviet Union in late 1991.

Women's singles

Men's doubles

, Demtshencko is the last person to win medals in both men's singles and men's doubles at the championships.

Mixed team

Medal table

References
Men's doubles European champions
Men's singles European champions
Mixed teams European champions
Women's singles European champions

FIL European Luge Championships
1996 in luge
Luge in Latvia
1996 in Latvian sport
International luge competitions hosted by Latvia
Sport in Sigulda